The YJ-82 is a Chinese subsonic anti-ship cruise missile. It is manufactured by the China Aerospace Science and Industry Corporation Third Academy.

The YJ-82 is the submarine-launched version of the YJ-8 missile family.

Description
The YJ-82 is a solid-fuelled rocket. It is launched from submarines from a buoyant launch canister. The YJ-82 lacks the solid-rocket booster of the surface-launched YJ-8/8A and likely has less range than the latter's 42 km. The terminal sea-skimming attack altitude is 5 to 7 meters.

The launch capsule is a copy of the one used by submarine-launched Harpoons; China likely received the technology from Pakistan, which had such weapons.

Development
In the fall of 1983, the People's Liberation Army Navy (PLAN) test fired YJ-8 missiles from a modified Type 033 submarine; the submarine had to surface to fire, and six missiles could be fired in six to seven minutes. The missile's short range and surface launch left the submarine vulnerable. The YJ-82 was developed by placing the missile inside a buoyant launch capsule; the capsule technology was acquired from Pakistan.

The YJ-82 was first test fired from a Type 039 submarine in 1997; initial tests did not go well. The first photographs of the missile appeared at the 2004 China International Aviation & Aerospace Exhibition.

Variants and derivatives
YJ-82
CM-708UNA - YJ-82 derivative, 128 km range
CM-708UNB - YJ-82 or YJ-83 derivative, 290 km range

References

Bibliography

Guided missiles of the People's Republic of China
Weapons of the People's Republic of China
Anti-ship cruise missiles of the People's Republic of China
Military equipment introduced in the 1990s